This was the first edition of the tournament.

Dominic Stricker won the title after defeating Vitaliy Sachko 6–4, 6–2 in the final, and as No. 874 became the lowest-ranked champion in Challenger history.

Seeds

Draw

Finals

Top half

Bottom half

References

External links
Main draw
Qualifying draw

Challenger Città di Lugano - 1